The Yellow Shark is an album of orchestral music by American musician Frank Zappa. Released in November 1993, it was the last Zappa album released in his lifetime, almost exactly a month before he died of the cancer from which he had suffered for several years. It features live recordings from the Ensemble Modern's 1992 performances of Zappa's compositions. In the album's notes, Zappa describes The Yellow Shark as one of the most fulfilling projects of his career, and as the best representation of his orchestral works.

Singer Tom Waits has listed it as one of his favourite albums, commenting: "The ensemble is awe-inspiring. It is a rich pageant of texture in colour. It's the clarity of his perfect madness, and mastery. Frank governs with Elmore James on his left and Stravinsky on his right. Frank reigns and rules with the strangest tools."

History
In 1991, Zappa was chosen to be one of four featured composers at the Frankfurt Festival in 1992 (the others were John Cage, Karlheinz Stockhausen and Alexander Knaifel). Zappa was approached by the German chamber ensemble, Ensemble Modern, which was interested in playing his music for the event. Although ill, Zappa invited them to Los Angeles for rehearsals of new compositions and new arrangements of older material. In addition to being satisfied with the ensemble's performances of his music, Zappa also got along with the musicians, and the concerts in Germany and Austria were set up for the fall. The Canadian choreographer Édouard Lock, the Canadian dancer Louise Lecavalier, and his company La La La Human Steps were part of the show. In September 1992, the concerts went ahead as scheduled, but Zappa could only appear at two in Frankfurt due to illness. At the first concert, he conducted the opening "Overture", and the final "G-Spot Tornado" as well as the theatrical "Food Gathering in Post-Industrial America, 1992" and "Welcome to the United States" (the remainder of the program was conducted by the ensemble's regular conductor Peter Rundel). The first concert was aired live by German pay TV channel Premiere, presented by the station's "Special" host Christian Eckert. Zappa received a 20-minute ovation. It would become his last professional public appearance, as the cancer was spreading to such an extent that he was in too much pain to enjoy an event that he otherwise found "exhilarating". Recordings from the concerts appeared on The Yellow Shark, Zappa's last release during his lifetime.

The posthumous album Everything Is Healing Nicely, released in 1999, contains recordings from around the same time, made in preparation for the performances documented on The Yellow Shark.

Track listing

Personnel
Musicians

 Frank Zappa – conductor, producer, performer
 Peter Rundel – conductor, violin
 Dietmar Wiesner – flute
 Catherine Milliken – oboe, english horn, bass oboe, didjeridu
 Roland Diry – clarinet
 Wolfgang Stryi – bass clarinet, tenor saxophone, contrabass clarinet
 Veit Scholz – bassoon, contrabassoon
 Franck Ollu, Stefan Dohr – french horn
 William Formann, Michael Gross – cornet, flugelhorn, piccolo trumpet, trumpet
 Uwe Dierksen – trombone, soprano trombone
 Michael Svoboda – trombone, euphonium, didjeridu, alphorn
 Daryl Smith – tuba
 Hermann Kretzschmar – celeste, harpsichord, voices, piano
 Ueli Wiget – celeste, harpsichord, harp, piano
 Rumi Ogawa-Helferich – cymbalom, percussion
 Andreas Böttger – percussion
 Detlef Tewes – mandolin
 Jürgen Ruck – banjo, guitar
 Ellen Wegner – harp
 Mathias Tacke, Claudia Sack – violin
 Hilary Sturt – violin, voices
 Friedemann Dähn – violoncello
 Thomas Fichter – contrabass, Fichter electric upright bass
 Ensemble Modern – main performer

Technical staff

 Todd Yvega – synclavier assistance
 Spencer Chrislu – engineer, mixing
 Harry Andronis – engineer
 Brian Johnson – art direction, design
 Hans Jörg Michel – photography
 Henning Lobner – photography
 Dave Dondorf – engineer, coordination
 Jesse Di Franco – art direction, design
 Mark Beam – Yellow Shark Sculpture
 Ali N. Askin – arranger
 Fritz Brinckmann – photography
 Rip Rense – liner notes booklet

Charts
Billboard (United States)

See also
 Frank Zappa
 Ensemble Modern

Notes

References

External links
 The Yellow Shark
 The Yellow Shark press conference with Frank Zappa and Ensemble Modern in Frankfurt am Main, Germany, 1992-07-21 [45:23]
 The Yellow Shark rehearsals, Alte Oper, Frankfurt am Main, Germany, 1992-09-16 [37:28]
 The Yellow Shark premiere concert, Alte Oper, Frankfurt am Main, Germany, 1992-09-17 [1:29:21]

1993 live albums
Frank Zappa live albums
Barking Pumpkin Records albums
Live classical albums
1993 classical albums